Say may refer to:

Music
Say (album), 2008 album by J-pop singer Misono
"Say" (John Mayer song), 2007
"Say (All I Need)", 2007 song by American pop rock band OneRepublic
"Say" (Method Man song), 2006 single by rapper Method Man
"Say" (Ryan Cabrera song), 2008 song from the album The Moon Under Water
"Say" (The Creatures song), 1999 song by English band The Creatures
A song by Cat Power from her 1998 album Moon Pix
A song by thenewno2 from EP001
A song by American rapper G-Eazy featuring rapper French Montana, released in 2014

People
Emel Say (1927–2011), Turkish painter
Fazıl Say (born 1970), a Turkish pianist and composer
Jean-Baptiste Say (1767–1832), a French economist
Louis Auguste Say (1774–1840), a French businessman and economist, brother of Jean-Baptiste
Princess Marie Say (1857–1943), a French heiress and aristocrat
Prof Maurice George Say (1902-1992) British electrical engineer
Rick Say (born 1979), an Olympic swimmer from Canada
Thomas Say (1787–1834), an American naturalist and entomologist
William Say (disambiguation), several people with that name
Zehra Say (1906–1990), Turkish painter
Say Chhum, a Cambodian politician
Say Piseth (born 1990), a Cambodian footballer

Transport
Swanley railway station, Kent, National Rail station code

Other uses
Say (magazine), a magazine published by and for Aboriginal youth in Canada
Say, Niger, a town in southwest Niger
saʿy, Islamic ritual travel between Safa and Marwa, partway between walking and running
Sakuranbo Television, a Japanese commercial broadcaster

See also
Seay, a surname